Owen Hannaway (8 October 1939 - 21 January 2006) was a Scottish historian.

Life 
He was born on 8 October 1939 in Glasgow, and educated at St Aloysius' College and Glasgow University.

He died in 2006.

Career 
He completed his PhD in Chemistry in 1965 at the University of Glasgow.

Distinctions 
He was an Edelstein International Fellow.  He received the Derek Price/Rod Webster Prize. He has also received the Dexter Award.

Selected publications

Articles
 (See Andreas Libavius and Tycho Brahe.)
 (See Ira Remsen.)

Books

 The Chemists And The Word: The Didactic Origins Of Chemistry (1975)

References 

20th-century Scottish historians
1939 births
2006 deaths
Writers from Glasgow
People educated at St Aloysius' College, Glasgow
Alumni of the University of Glasgow
Academics of the University of Glasgow
Historians of science
Scottish emigrants to the United States